Benzylone (also known as 3,4-Methylenedioxy-N-benzylcathinone or BMDP), is a recreational designer drug from the substituted cathinone family, with stimulant effects. It has been commonly encountered in seizures of street drug samples but appears to have relatively low potency on its own, being mainly found as a component of mixtures with other related drugs.

See also 
 Benzedrone
 Benzphetamine
 MDBZ
 Methylone
 Ethylone
 Butylone
 Eutylone
 Pentylone
 Ephylone
 Isohexylone
 N-Ethylhexylone

References 

Cathinones
Designer drugs